Pleurobranchus crossei is a species of pleurobranchid sea slug, a type of marine gastropod mollusc

Description
The size of the holotype is 22 mm.

Distribution
This species is commonly found in the Caribbean Sea.

References

 Ortea J., Espinosa J., Caballer M. & Buske Y. (2012) Initial inventory of the seaslugs (Opisthobranchia and Sacoglossa) from the expedition Karubentos, held in May 2012 in Guadeloupe (Lesser Antilles, Caribbean Sea). Revista de la Academia Canaria de Ciencias 24: 153-182. 
 Ortea J., Moro L. & Caballer M. (2014). Contribución al estudio de la familia Pleurobranchidae Gray, 1827 (Mollusca: Opisthobranchia) en la Macaronesia y las islas Galápagos. Vieraea. 42: 117-148
 Ortea J. & Moro L. (2017). Nuevas citas y nuevos datos sobre las lesmas do mar (Mollusca: Heterobranchia) de las islas de Cabo Verde, con el restablecimiento de Tritonia pallescens (Eliot, 1906). Avicennia. 21: 1-10.

External links
 Vayssière, A. (1897 (1896). Description de deux espèces nouvelles de Pleurobranchidés. Journal de Conchyliologie. 44(3): 353-356 
 Goodheart J., Camacho-García Y., Padula V., Schrödl M., Cervera J.L., Gosliner T.M. & Valdés Á. (2015). Systematics and biogeography of Pleurobranchus Cuvier, 1804, sea slugs (Heterobranchia: Nudipleura: Pleurobranchidae). Zoological Journal of the Linnean Society. 174: 322-362
 Alvim J. & Pimenta A.D. (2016). Comparative morphology and redescription of Pleurobranchus species (Gastropoda, Pleurobranchoidea) from Brazil. Zoological Studies. 55: 15

Pleurobranchidae
Gastropods described in 1897